Nehru Stadium, formerly known as Club of Maharashtra Ground, is a multi-purpose stadium in Pune, India.  It is mainly used for cricket matches. The stadium was built in 1969 and holds a capacity of 25,000.

The ground is home to Maharashtra Cricket Team who represent the state of Maharashtra in Ranji Trophy.

International Cricket
The stadium has hosted 11 One Day International matches including two in the Cricket World Cup (1987 & 1996), 4 WODI till date. The first ever ODI played on this ground was between India and England in 1984. The ground is yet to host a test match.

One of cricket's biggest upsets occurred on this very ground when Kenya beat West Indies in a low scoring encounter in the 1996 Cricket World Cup.
List of ODIs

List of WODIs

Cricket World Cup

This stadium has hosted One Day International (ODI) matches when India hosted the Cricket World Cup.

 1987 Cricket World Cup
 1996 Cricket World Cup

1987 Cricket World Cup

 Sri Lanka v/s England:

1996 Cricket World Cup

 Kenya v/s West Indies:

List of Centuries

Key
 * denotes that the batsman was not out.
 Inns. denotes the number of the innings in the match.
 Balls denotes the number of balls faced in an innings.
 NR denotes that the number of balls was not recorded.
 Parentheses next to the player's score denotes his century number at Edgbaston.
 The column title Date refers to the date the match started.
 The column title Result refers to the player's team result

One Day Internationals

List of Five Wicket Hauls

Key

One Day Internationals

The leading run scorers here have been Mike Gatting- 161 runs, Mark Waugh- 133 runs and Chris Cairns- 130 runs. The leading wicket takers here have been Ajit Agarkar- 8 wickets, Kapil Dev, Javagal Srinath and Brad Williams- 5 wickets.

Notes and references
dshshshs

External links
 Info on venue.
 More info on Nehru statium at Doors2India

Cricket grounds in Maharashtra
Multi-purpose stadiums in India
Cricket grounds in Pune
Sport in Pune
Sports venues in Pune
Sports venues in Maharashtra
Monuments and memorials to Jawaharlal Nehru
Defunct cricket grounds in India
Cricket in Pune
1987 Cricket World Cup stadiums
1996 Cricket World Cup stadiums
1969 establishments in Maharashtra
Sports venues completed in 1969
20th-century architecture in India